La liceale al mare con l'amica di papà (High School Girl at the Beach with Dad's Friend) is a 1980 commedia sexy all'italiana film directed by Marino Girolami and starring Renzo Montagnani. Although presented as the latest installment in the commercially successful Liceale series, the film despite its title and the token blonde high school girl character, has little to no resemblance to earlier films starring Gloria Guida.

Plot
Massimo Castaldi (Montagnani) is a social climber married to Violante (Marisa Mell), who comes from a rich family. His relationship with his mistress Laura (Cinzia De Ponti) is jeopardised when the family moves to its summer house on the Apulian coast of the Adriatic. Nevertheless, Massimo seems to find a solution. His raunchy daughter Sonia (Sabrina Siani) has failed in her Esame di Stato conclusivo del corso di studio di istruzione secondaria superiore exam, and he plans to present Laura as a nun who will give Sonia private lessons to re-take her exam. On the other hand, there are two dim-witted criminals, Terenzio (Alvaro Vitali) and Fulgenzio (Gianni Ciardo), who are planning to kidnap one of the Castaldi family for a large ransom.

Cast
Renzo Montagnani: Massimo Castaldi
Marisa Mell: Violante Castaldi
Alvaro Vitali: Terenzio
Gianni Ciardo: Fulgenzio
Cinzia De Ponti: Laura
Sabrina Siani: Sonia Castaldi
Andrea Brambilla: Arcibaldo
Lucio Montanaro: Gustavo

Related films 
La liceale (1975)   

La liceale nella classe dei ripetenti (1978) 
La liceale seduce i professori (1979)   
La liceale, il diavolo e l'acquasanta (1979), anthology film

References

External links

1980 films
Commedia sexy all'italiana
Liceale films
Films directed by Marino Girolami
1980s sex comedy films
1980 comedy films
1980s Italian-language films
1980s Italian films